Mary Hayes Houghton (March 26, 1837 – November 12, 1921) was an American journalist.

Early life
Houghton was born Mary Hayes in Penfield, Ohio to Western Reserve pioneer parents from New England on March 26, 1837. The eldest daughter of a large family, her school life was frequently interrupted by ill-health. Despite her health issues her reading and study went on, covering a large range in history, philosophy and literature.

She married John Wesley Houghton, a writer and medical doctor, in 1874.

Career
From the age of eighteen years, Houghton had written for publications and her connection with the press served to give variety, breadth and finish to her composition. The bulk of her literary work was anonymously written, and some of it was widely copied. She actively identified with multiple organizations that were at various times religious, reformatory and literary. She was president of a woman's club and also a member of the Ohio Woman's Press Association.  In addition, she was also a member of the Woman's Christian Temperance Union (W.C.T.U.), and a founding member of both the Woman's Home and the Foreign Missionary Societies.

In 1876, two years after their marriage, John Houghton became proprietor of The Wellington Enterprise and Mary was his assistant editor. Though she was characterized in an 1897 biographical sketch as an "editorial assistant" to her husband, he later wrote in a family history that she was his "assistant editor" and "contributed the larger share of copy" (Houghton Genealogy, pg. 142). After nine years, the paper was sold due to John Houghton's failing health in 1885.

References

Attribution

External links
 

1837 births
1921 deaths
19th-century American newspaper editors
19th-century American women writers
American women journalists
Editors of Ohio newspapers
Journalists from Ohio
People from Lorain County, Ohio
Women newspaper editors
Wikipedia articles incorporating text from A Woman of the Century